Nick Caistor (born 15 July 1946) is a British translator and journalist, best known for his translations of Spanish and Portuguese literature. He is a past winner of the Valle-Inclán Prize for translation. He is a regular contributor to BBC Radio 4, the BBC World Service, The Times Literary Supplement, and The Guardian. He lives in Norwich, and is married to fellow translator Amanda Hopkinson.

As translator
 Luis Gutiérrez Maluenda, Music for the Dead 
 César Aira, The Hare 
 Roberto Arlt, The Seven Madmen 
 Dulce Chacón, The Sleeping Voice
 Paulo Coelho, The Devil and Miss Prym (with Amanda Hopkinson)
 Edgardo Cozarinsky, The Bride from Odessa
 Edgardo Cozarinsky, The Moldavian Pimp
 Rolo Diez, Tequila Blue
 Eugenio Dittborn, Mapa: Airmail Paintings (with Claudia Rousseau)
 Carlos María Domínguez, The House of Paper (with Peter Sis)
 Ildefonso Falcones, Cathedral of the Sea
 Rodolfo Fogwill, Malvinas Requiem
 Alicia Gimenez-Bartlett, Dog Day
 Alicia Gimenez-Bartlett, Prime Time Suspect
 Martín Kohan, Seconds Out
 Martín Kohan, School For Patriots
 Pedro Mairal, The Missing Year of Juan Salvatierra
 Juan Marsé, Shanghai Nights
 Alberto Méndez, Blind Sunflowers
 Eduardo Mendoza, A Light Comedy
 Eduardo Mendoza, An Englishman in Madrid
 Eduardo Mendoza, The Year of the Flood 
 Eduardo Mendoza, The Mystery of the Enchanted Crypt 
 Eduardo Mendoza, No Word from Gurb
 Andrés Neuman, Talking to Ourselves
 Andrés Neuman, Traveler of the Century (with  Lorenza Garcia)
 Juan Carlos Onetti, The Shipyard
 Guillermo Orsi, No-one Loves a Policeman 
 Guillermo Orsi, Holy City 
 Hernando Calvo Ospina, ¡Salsa!: Havana Heat, Bronx Beat
 Isabel Allende, The Japanese Lover
 Isabel Allende, In the midst of winter
 Félix J. Palma, The Map of Time
 Félix J. Palma, The Map of the Sky
 Alan Pauls, The Past
 Napoleón Baccino Ponce de León, Five Black Ships: A Novel of the Discoverers
 Carmen Posadas, Child's Play (with Amanda Hopkinson)
 Julián Ríos, Procession of Shadows
 Alonso Salazar, Born to Die in Medellín (with introduction by Colin Harding)
 Carolina Sanín, The Children
 José Saramago, Journey to Portugal (with Amanda Hopkinson)
 Lorenzo Silva, The Faint-Hearted Bolshevik (with Isabelle Kaufeler)
 Dominique Sylvain, The Dark Angel: A Diesel and Jost Investigation
 Valérie Tasso, Insatiable: The Erotic Adventures Of A French Girl In Spain
 Manuel Vázquez Montalbán, The Buenos Aires Quintet (Pepe Carvalho Mysteries)
 Manuel Vázquez Montalbán, Tattoo
 Manuel Vázquez Montalbán, The Man of My Life
 Pedro Zarraluki, The History of Silence

As author, co-author, or editor
 Mexico (DK Eyewitness Travel Guides) (with Maria Doulton and Petra Fischer)
 Che Guevara: A Life
 The Rainstick Pack (Sacred Earth Series)
 The World in View: Spain
 The World in View: Argentina
 The World in View: Israel
 Picking Up the Pieces: Corruption and Democracy in Peru (LAB Short Books) (with Susana Villaran)
 Columbus's Egg: New Latin American Stories on the Conquest (editor) 
 Fidel Castro (Critical Lives) 
 Buenos Aires
 Mexico City: A Cultural and Literary Companion (Cities of the Imagination)
 Chile in Focus: A Guide to the People, Politics and Culture
 Argentina in Focus: A Guide to the People, Politics and Culture
 The Faber Book of Contemporary Latin American Short Stories (editor)
 Nicaragua in Focus: A Guide to the People, Politics and Culture (with Hazel Plunkett)

References

1946 births
Living people
British translators
Portuguese–English translators
Spanish–English translators